Shams Ma'an Power Plant is a 160 MW photovoltaic power station in Ma'an, Jordan. As of 2018, it is the second largest solar power plant in the region. It was inaugurated on October 8, 2016, as part of Jordan's long-term plan to diversify its energy resources.

The plant produces 1% of Jordan's total electrical energy production, with the project costing around $160 million.

See also
Baynouna Solar Power Plant
Quweira Solar Power Plant
Tafila Wind Farm

References 

Energy infrastructure completed in 2016
Solar power in Asia
Power stations in Jordan